The 1979 Missouri Valley Conference men's basketball tournament was held February 27–March 3; the quarterfinal and semifinal rounds were played on campus sites and the final was contested at the Hulman Center on the campus of Indiana State University in Terre Haute, Indiana.

Led by future Basketball Hall of Fame member Larry Bird, top-seeded Indiana State defeated  in the championship game, 69–59, to win their first MVC tournament title.

The Sycamores subsequently received an automatic bid to the 1979 NCAA tournament, where they would advance to the national championship game.

Format
Even without any new Missouri Valley Conference members, the conference decreased the size of the tournament field from nine to eight. In turn, only the top eight teams from the conference's regular season standings were included in the bracket.

All eight qualifying teams were placed into the first round, seeded and paired based on regular season conference records. The highest-seeded team in each game served as the host.

Bracket

Note: * indicates host institution

References

Missouri Valley Conference men's basketball tournament
1978–79 Missouri Valley Conference men's basketball season
1979 in sports in Indiana